China's Little Devils (aka Little Devils) is a 1945 war film, directed by Monta Bell and starring Harry Carey, Paul Kelly and "Ducky" Louie. It is one of a number of Hollywood films dealing with the exploits of the Flying Tigers that began with the Republic Pictures production Flying Tigers (1942).

Plot
After being shot down, "Big Butch" Dooley (Paul Kelly), a Flying Tigers pilot lands his Curtiss P-40 Warhawk in the ruins of a Chinese village. After he rescues a wounded boy, orphaned by the war, Dooley takes him back to his unit.

The young orphan is adopted by the Flying Tigers, and is called "Little Butch" Dooley. Big Butch and the other Tigers realize that the boy needs a proper education and send him to the Temple Missionary School run by "Doc" Temple (Harry Carey).

Little Butch organizes the other refugee children and trains them in fighting the invading Japanese. Leading the children, dubbed "Little Devils," in nightly raids, Little Dutch takes over a store of gasoline, but he is wounded during the battle.

Two of the two of the Little Devils are taken prisoner while blowing up a Japanese supply base. When Doc pleads with a Japanese officer for their release, he learns about the attack on Pearl Harbor and realizes he will be taken prisoner. Little Butch rescues Doc, and soon after, the Japanese bomb the mission.

Later, an American aircraft crashes, and the Little Devils race with the Japanese to reach the wreck. The Little Devils find the aircraft first and are surprised to discover that the pilot is Big Butch. After treating Big Butch's wounds, the Little Devils help him cross a river and return safely to the Chinese lines.

As the young boys are escaping, however, a Japanese patrol converges on them. They sacrifice their lives while shooting it out with the enemy, and sometime later, the spirit of Little Butch rides with Big Butch, as he drops bombs on Tokyo.

Cast

 Harry Carey as "Doc" Temple
 Paul Kelly as "Big Butch" Dooley
 "Ducky" Louie as Little Butch Dooley
 Gloria Ann Chew as Betty Lou
 Hayward Soo Hoo as Little Joe Doakes
 Jimmie Dodd as Eddie (as Jimmy Dodd)
 Ralph Lewis as Harry
 Philip Ahn as Farmer
 Richard Loo as Colonel Huraji
 Wing Foo as Captain Subi
 Jean Wong as Nurse
 Fred Mah as Patrick
 Nancy Hsueh as Baby
 Oie Chan as Farmer's wife
 Aen-Ling Chow as Daughter

Production
Monogram Pictures had a history of B movie productions and China's Little Devils  fits that scenario. The film utilized sequences from Flying Tigers (1942) as well, as the Curtiss P-40 mockups used in the earlier film.

Principal photography on  China's Little Devils took place from June 30 until early August, 1944. Most of the filming took place on studio backlots.

Reception
Film historian Leonard Maltin described China's Little Devils as a "Patriotic WW2 yarn involving Chinese waifs who battle Japanese invaders and come to the aid of downed American pilots."

References

Notes

Citations

Bibliography

 Farmer, James H. Celluloid Wings: The Impact of Movies on Aviation (1st ed.). Blue Ridge Summit, Pennsylvania: TAB Books 1984. .
 Paris, Michael. From the Wright Brothers to Top gun: Aviation, Nationalism, and Popular Cinema. Manchester, UK: Manchester University Press, 1995. .

External links
 
 

American aviation films
American war films
American black-and-white films
Films about orphans
Films directed by Monta Bell
Films set in China
Flying Tigers in fiction
Monogram Pictures films
Second Sino-Japanese War films
World War II films made in wartime
1945 war films
1940s English-language films